Berg Publishers was an academic publishing company based in Oxford, Oxfordshire, England and Providence, Rhode Island, United States. It was founded in the United Kingdom in 1983 by Marion Berghahn. Berg published monographs, textbooks, reference works, and academic journals. It focused on fashion, design, anthropology, history, and cultural studies. Operations in providence began shortly after Berghahn's husband, historian Volker Berghahn, accepted a chair at Brown University in 1988.

History 
In 2003, Berg Publishers was bought from its Marion Berghahn by its managers Kathryn Earle and Sara Everett. Since then, the original owner, Marion Berghahn, has been the director of Berghahn Books, which she founded in 1994.

The Book Industry Communication (BIC), a trade standards group for electronic commerce and supply chain efficiency, awarded Berg its BIC Product Data Excellence Gold Award in 2007–2008 and its e4books project accredited Berg in 2008. Berg won the Independent Publishers Guild's 2008 Publishing Technology E-Publishing Award for its collection of profitable digital strategies in March 2008.

By March 2008, Berg had published thirteen journals. Since 2013, all Berg titles have been published under the Bloomsbury name (under the imprint Bloomsbury Academic).

References

External links 
 

Academic publishing companies
Book publishing companies of England
Publishing companies established in 1983
1983 establishments in England
2013 disestablishments in England
Defunct publishing companies
Publishing companies disestablished in 2013